"Remember the Time" is a 1992 single by American singer and songwriter Michael Jackson. It was released by Epic Records on January 14, 1992, as the second single from Jackson's eighth studio album, Dangerous. The song was written and composed by Teddy Riley, Jackson and Bernard Belle, and produced by Riley and Jackson. The song's lyrics are written about remembering having fallen in love with someone.

"Remember the Time" was generally well received by contemporary critics. The song was commercially successful, peaking at number three on the Billboard Hot 100 and number one on the Billboard Hot R&B Singles as well as the Mainstream Top 40 chart. It is certified 3× Platinum by the Recording Industry Association of America (RIAA). Internationally, the song was a Top 10 hit in nine countries, peaking at No.1 in New Zealand, at No.2 in Spain and No.3 in the United Kingdom.

A nine-minute music video directed by John Singleton, marketed as a "short film", was released for the song. The video is set in Ancient Egypt and features appearances of Jackson, Eddie Murphy, Iman, Tommy "Tiny" Lister and Magic Johnson. It has appeared on the video albums: Dangerous – The Short Films, Video Greatest Hits – HIStory and Michael Jackson's Vision. The music video, along with other videos from Dangerous, was frequently shown on MTV.

Background
"Remember the Time" was written by Teddy Riley, Michael Jackson and Bernard Belle, and was produced by Riley and Jackson. It was recorded at Record One studios. It was released as the second single from Michael Jackson's eighth studio album, Dangerous, on January 14, 1992. "Remember the Time" is three minutes fifty nine seconds long. The song's music was compared to Jackson's 1979 single, "Rock with You" from his Off the Wall album.

Co-writer Teddy Riley supposedly stated in a 1996 Los Angeles Times interview that he was inspired to write the song after hearing Jackson describe "falling in love with the woman he just married". The article assumes he is referring to Debbie Rowe but Riley himself makes no mention of her. In a 2011 reply to a fan on Twitter, Riley denied that the song was about Rowe. Others have noted that when the single was originally released in 1992, Jackson dedicated the song to Diana Ross.

Composition
"Remember the Time" is a R&B song fused with new jack swing. The lyrics recall a youthful love affair: "Do you remember when we fell in love/We were young and innocent then". The song is set in the key of F minor with Jackson's voice range from E3 to B5. The song's tempo is moderate at 108 beats per minute.

Live performances
"Remember the Time" was rehearsed for the Dangerous World Tour but was ultimately cut due to wardrobe malfunctions. At the 1993 Soul Train Music Awards, the song won the award for Best R&B/Soul Single - Male. Jackson appeared with an injured foot and on crutches, but was able to perform the song seated on the throne, surrounded by dancers.

Critical reception
"Remember the Time" was generally well received by contemporary music critics. Chris Lacy from Albumism noted that "the warmth and nostalgia" of the song "harkens back to Jackson's Motown roots". Stephen Thomas Erlewine, a writer for AllMusic, commented that Dangerous had "plenty" of "professional craftsmanship at its peak" because of "such fine singles" like "In the Closet" and "Remember the Time". Erlewine also listed it as being a highlight from the album. Larry Flick from Billboard said the song "shows the King of Pop downplaying his signature whoops and shrieks in favor a decidedly soulful and affecting vocal performance. Insinuating new-jack grooves work well, encasing an immediately memorable hook." A reviewer from Cashbox noted, "This smooth dance ballad sounds like it could have come from the Off The Wall album and has more of the mouth noise, whoops and hollers that we guess will take Mr. Jackson several more albums to out-grow." Pan-European magazine Music & Media wrote that it is a "danceable multi-format smash, dedicated to his mentor Diana Ross." Jon Parales of The New York Times commented that "titles like 'Remember the Time', 'She Drives Me Wild' and 'Give in to Me'" tell the lyrics' "whole story - though they don't suggest the wretched tone he has when he sings them." A writer from People Magazine said that "the strength of this record stems from bouncy, up-tempo pop" like "Remember the Time". Alan Light, a writer for Rolling Stone, stated that he felt it was the "most lighthearted musical track on the album" and described the song's lyrics as telling of a "blissful romance only to ask, 'So why did it end?'" Richard Harrington, a writer for The Washington Post, described "Remember the Time" as being "wistful," commenting that he felt that the song featured Jackson's "least affected vocal performance" but that it "builds an engaging, radio-friendly momentum".

Chart performance
"Remember the Time" peaked at number three on the Billboard Hot 100 on March 7, 1992, seven weeks after the single release. The song saw similar success on other Billboard charts; topping the R&B/Hip-Hop Songs on March 7, and peaking at number two in Dance/Club Play Songs on April 4, 1992, and number 15 in Adult Contemporary on March 21 in the same year. The song peaked at number two on Billboards Hot Dance Music/Maxi Singles Sales. It was certified Gold by the Recording Industry Association of America for the shipment of over 500,000 units in the United States in March 1992, and later Triple Platinum in 2022. The song saw similar commercial success internationally, charting in the top 20 in all major territories at the time of its release. In the United Kingdom, "Remember the Time" first entered the chart on February 15, 1992, placing at number six. The following week, on February 22, the song charted at number three, where it peaked; the song remained on the charts for a total of eight weeks.

"Remember the Time" topped the New Zealand charts for two consecutive weeks, having first entered the chart at number three on February 23. It peaked at number four in the Netherlands and Switzerland. The song also charted within the top ten on the French, Australian, Swedish, Italian, and Norwegian charts; peaking at number five, six, eight and ten. It charted in the top 20, peaking at number 16, in Austria. Having been re-issued for Jackson's Visionary campaign in 2006, "Remember the Time" peaked at number two in Spain on the charts issue date on May 14, 2006. After Jackson's death in June 2009, his music saw a surge in popularity. In the United Kingdom, on the chart of July 11, the song re-entered at number 81.

Music video
The accompanying music video for "Remember the Time" was filmed in January 1992 at the Universal Studios Hollywood backlot. Prior to the release of the video, Jackson's record label promoted it by releasing clips, as well as releasing behind the scenes clips of making the video. The nine-minute video was promoted as a "short film". It premiered on ABC, NBC and Fox and BET on February 2, 1992. After the video premiered on MTV, the channel aired a "rockumentary" called "More Dangerous Than Ever" which included glimpses of the making of the video. Jackson's record label would not release the video's budget figures. Directed by John Singleton and choreographed by Fatima Robinson, the video was an elaborate production and became one of Jackson's longest videos at over nine minutes. It was set in ancient Egypt and featured groundbreaking visual effects and appearances by Eddie Murphy, Iman, The Pharcyde, Magic Johnson, Tom "Tiny" Lister Jr. and Wylie Draper, who portrayed Jackson as an adult in the made-for-TV movie The Jacksons: An American Dream and died shortly after appearing in this video.

Jackson appears in the video as a hooded wizard who enters an Egyptian palace and attempts to entertain the Pharaoh's bored Queen (Iman). Two other entertainers had previously failed, and she has sent them to be executed. The Queen sees that this wizard is different — instead of juggling or eating fire, he walks up the steps to her throne and sings to her, asking her if she "remembers the time" they were together. The Pharaoh (Murphy) hardly appreciates this move and summons his guards. The wizard hides from the searching guards, secretly met the Queen and they kissed passionately. Then Jackson and begins an elaborate, Egyptian-style choreography with the Pharaoh's servants. When the guards find him, Jackson turns into golden sand. In the video, Jackson was dressed in a costume made of gold satin. He wore golden chain mail, a white skirt with a phallic dangling sash, black pants and black boots. This video features a physically complicated dance routine that became the centerpiece of other videos from the Dangerous album.

The music video was generally well received by music critics. Ira Robbins of Entertainment Weekly described the "Remember the Time" video as being a "gorgeous ancient Egyptian extravaganza". The music video appeared on the video albums: Dangerous – The Short Films, Video Greatest Hits – HIStory and Michael Jackson's Vision. The music video, along with other videos from Dangerous, was frequently shown on MTV.

Track listing
 US CD Maxi Single
"Remember the Time (Silky Soul 7" Mix)" – 4:21
"Remember the Time (New Jack Radio Mix)" – 4:00
"Remember the Time (12" Main Mix)" – 4:47
"Remember the Time (E-Smoove's Late Nite Mix)" – 7:20
"Remember the Time (Maurice's Underground Mix)" – 7:29
"Black Or White (Clivillés & Cole Radio Mix)" – 3:33
"Black Or White (House With Guitar Radio Mix)" – 3:53
"Black Or White (Clivillés & Cole House/Club Mix)" – 7:33
"Black Or White (The Underground Club Mix)" – 7:30

Personnel
 Written and composed by Teddy Riley, Michael Jackson and Bernard Belle
 Produced by Teddy Riley and Michael Jackson 
 Recorded and mixed by Bruce Swedien, Teddy Riley and Dave Way
 Solo and background vocals, vocal arrangement by Michael Jackson
 Keyboards, synthesizers, drum programming and synthesizer arrangements by Teddy Riley
 Sequencing and programming by Wayne Cobham

Charts and certifications

Weekly charts

Year-end charts

Certifications

See also
 List of number-one R&B singles of 1992 (U.S.)

References

External links
 Music video

1991 songs
1992 singles
Ancient Egypt in the American imagination
Epic Records singles
Michael Jackson songs
New jack swing songs
Songs about nostalgia
Songs written by Michael Jackson
Song recordings produced by Teddy Riley
Song recordings produced by Michael Jackson
Songs written by Teddy Riley
Songs written by Bernard Belle